A number of places, mostly in the Western Hemisphere, have been named after Christopher Columbus, the  voyager who was the first European to make the New World widely known to Europeans.

Countries
Colombia
Gran Colombia (historical)

Subnational jurisdictions
British Columbia, province of Canada
Colón Province, province of Panama
Columbia District (historical), disputed between the United Kingdom and the United States
District of Columbia, federal district of the United States

Cities, towns, and villages
Colombo, Brazil, municipality in the state of Paraná
Columbia, California, city
Columbia, Connecticut town
Columbus, Georgia, city
Columbia, Illinois, city
Columbus, Indiana, city
Columbus, Kansas, city
Columbia, Maine, town
Columbia, Maryland, census-designated place
Columbia Heights, Minnesota, suburb of Minneapolis
Columbus, Mississippi, city
Columbia, Missouri, city
Columbus, Montana, town

Columbia, New Hampshire, town
Columbus, New Mexico, village
Columbus, New York, town
Columbus, North Carolina, town
Columbiana, Ohio, city
Columbus, Ohio, capital of the U.S. state
Colón, Panama, second-largest city in Panama
Columbia, South Carolina, capital of the U.S state
Columbia, Tennessee, city
Columbus, Texas,  city
Columbus, Wisconsin, city

Counties
Columbia County, Georgia
Columbia County, New York
Columbia County, Oregon
Columbia County, Pennsylvania
Columbia County, Wisconsin
Columbiana County, Ohio
Columbus County, North Carolina

Streets and urban components

Europe

Italy
 Streets in numerous cities, such as Cristoforo Colombo Avenue in Rome, connecting Ostia with the EUR district. 

Portugal
At least 20 streets, 1 avenue and 1 square; also a shopping mall

North America
Canada
Québec
Avenue Christophe-Colomb, Montréal, Québec, Canada
Avenue Colomb, Brossard, Québec, Canada
Rue Christophe-Colomb, Ville de Québec, Québec, Canada
Rue Christophe-Colomb, Boucherville, Québec, Canada
Rue Christophe-Colomb, Chibougamau, Québec, Canada
Rue Christophe-Colomb, Cowanswille, Québec, Canada
Rue Christophe-Colomb, Gatineau, Québec, Canada
Rue Christophe-Colomb, Granby, Québec, Canada
Rue Christophe-Colomb, La Tuque, Québec, Canada
Rue Christophe-Colomb, Lévis, Québec, Canada
Rue Christophe-Colomb, Repentigny, Québec, Canada
Rue Christophe-Colomb, Sept-Îles, Québec, Canada
Rue Christophe-Colomb, Thetford Mines, Québec, Canada
Rue Colomb, Rawdon, Québec, Canada
Rue Colomb, Sainte-Catherine, Québec, Canada
Chemin Christophe-Colomb, Val-des-Monts, Québec, Canada
Parc Christophe-Colomb, Saint-Jean-sur-Richelieu, Québec, Canada
United States
Columbus Circle, New York, New York, USA
Columbus Avenue, San Francisco, California, USA
Columbus Avenue, Columbus, Ohio, USA
Columbus Avenue, New York, New York, USA
Columbus Avenue, Boston, Massachusetts, USA
Columbus Street, Columbus, Ohio, USA
Interstate 10, in California, is designated and signed as the Christopher Columbus Transcontinental Highway

Asia
Philippines
Colon Street, Cebu, Philippines

Other

North America
Canada
Québec
Lac Colomb, Eeyou Istchee Baie-James, Québec, Canada
Rivière Colomb, Eeyou Istchee Baie-James, Québec, Canada
Pointe Colomb, L'Île-d'Anticosti, Québec, Canada

References

Columbus, Christopher
Christopher Columbus